Desaguadero (Spanish for "channel, drain for drawing off superfluous water") or Chaka Marka (Aymara and Quechua for "bridge village") is a town on the Bolivian-Peruvian border. On the Bolivian side it is situated in the La Paz Department, Ingavi Province, Desaguadero Municipality, Desaguadero Canton. On the Peruvian side it lies in the Puno Region, Chucuito Province, Desaguadero District. Both parts of the town are united by a binational bridge.

The town is located 86 km from La Paz, 146 km from Puno city and 190 km from Juliaca.

Climate
Desaguadero has a tropical subalpine climate (Cwc).
<div style="width:%">

Source:

References

  Instituto Nacional de Estadística

Populated places in La Paz Department (Bolivia)
Bolivia–Peru border crossings